

Arthropods

Newly named insects

Fish

Newly named Ray-finned fish

Archosauromorphs

Newly named dinosaurs

Plesiosaurs

New taxa

Synapsids

Non-mammalian

References